Zarchasma (Russian and Tajik: Зарчашма, formerly: Qaromazor) is a village in Sughd Region, northern Tajikistan. It is part of the jamoat Adrasmon in the city of Guliston.

References

Populated places in Sughd Region